Roswell is an unincorporated community in Canyon County in the U.S. state of Idaho.

Roswell is located 2 mi (3.2 km) south of Parma. Founded in 1889, it was named by and for an early settler and school teacher who dreamed of founding a town in that spot.

Roswell Grade School was added to the National Register of Historic Places in 1982.

Gallery

References

Unincorporated communities in Canyon County, Idaho
Unincorporated communities in Idaho
Boise metropolitan area